Sanjhauli, also spelled Sajhauli, is a village and corresponding community development block in Rohtas district of Bihar, India. As of 2011, the village of Sanjhauli had a population of 7,608, in 1,269 households, while the entire block had a population of 62,621. The nearest major city is Bikramganj.

Demographics 
Sanjhauli is an entirely rural subdistrict, with no major urban centers. Sanjhauli block's population increased from 51,465 in 2001 to 62,621 in 2011, representing a 21.7% increase. In both census years, the block had the second-lowest population in the block, with only Suryapura having fewer people.

The sex ratio of Sanjhauli block was 915 in 2011, slightly below the district average of 918. The sex ratio was lower in the 0-6 age group, at 910.

Members of scheduled castes numbered 10,714 in Sanjhauli block in 2011, making up 17.11% of the population.

Literacy in Sanjhauli block was slightly above average for Rohtas district in 2011, with 76.47% of the population able to read and write compared to the district average of 73.37%. Literacy was higher in men than in women, with 86.71% of males but only 65.30% of females able to read and write; the corresponding 21.41% literacy gender gap was about average for the district.

Employment 
Most people in Sanjhauli block were engaged in agriculture in 2011. 37.12% of the workforce were cultivators who owned or leased their own land (the largest proportion in Rohtas), and a further 42.20% were agricultural labourers who worked someone else's land for money. 3.95% of the workforce was employed in household industries, and 16.73% were employed in other forms of work.

Amenities 
Sanjhauli does not have tap water, with drinking water instead being supplied by hand pump. It has bus service and a train station along with river-based transport. It has permanent pucca roads, which are connected to state and national highways. The village hosts a daily mandi as well as a weekly haat. It has a bank with an ATM as well as an agricultural credit society. There is a community centre, a public library, and sports fields. There are no movie theatres.

On the block level, 32 of the 41 inhabited villages in Sanjhauli block had schools, serving 93.65% of the population. 2 villages had medical facilities, serving 18.7% of the population. All villages had access to drinking water, although only two, Masauna and Basaura, had access to tap water. 34 had telephone coverage, serving 89.45% of the population, and 7 villages had post offices. 3 villages had banks and agricultural credit societies, and 33 had transportation communications (rail, bus, or navigable waterways). 31 villages had permanent pucca roads. 39 villages had electricity, serving 98.73% of the block population.

Villages 
There are 45 villages in Sanjhauli block, including Sanjhauli itself; 41 are inhabited and 4 are uninhabited.

References 

Villages in Rohtas district